Serge Dassault (born Serge Paul André Bloch; 4 April 1925 – 28 May 2018) was a French engineer, businessman and politician. He was the chairman and chief executive officer of Dassault Group, and a conservative politician. According to Forbes, Dassault's net worth was estimated in 2016 at US$15 billion.

Early life and education
He was the younger son of Madeleine Dassault ( Minckes) and Marcel Dassault (born Marcel Ferdinand Bloch), from whom he inherited the Dassault Group. Both his parents were of Jewish heritage, but later converted to Roman Catholicism. 

In 1929, his father founded what is now Dassault Aviation. During the Second World War, he was jailed when his father was sent to Buchenwald for refusing any cooperation from his company, Bordeaux-Aéronautique, directed by Henri Déplante, André Curvale and Claude de Cambronne, with the German aviation industry.

He studied at the Lycée Janson de Sailly. He earned engineering degrees from the École Polytechnique (class of 1946) and Supaéro (class of 1951). In 1963, he received an Executive MBA from HEC Paris.

Business career

After his father's death in 1986, Serge Dassault continued developing the company, with the help of CEOs Charles Edelstenne and Éric Trappier. His group also owned the newspaper Le Figaro. In December 1998, he was sentenced to two years' probation in the Belgian Agusta scandal, and was fined 60,000 Belgian francs (about €1,500).

According to Forbes, the Dassault family also owns a winery, property in Paris, and an art auction house.

Political career
Dassault was a member of the Union for a Popular Movement political party, as was his son Olivier, who was a deputy in the National Assembly. He was a former mayor of the city of Corbeil-Essonnes, a southern suburb of Paris.

In 2004, he became a senator, and in that position, he was an outspoken advocate of conservative positions on economic and employment issues, claiming that France's taxes and workforce regulations ruin its entrepreneurs. In 2005, he inaugurated the €2 million Islamic cultural centre (comprising a mosque) in his city of Corbeil-Essonnes. In November 2012, responding to the Ayrault government's plan to legalise same-sex marriage, he controversially said, during an interview for France Culture, that authorising it would cause "no more renewal of the population. [...] We'll have a country of homosexuals. And so in ten years there'll be nobody left. It's stupid".

Personal life and death

Dassault married Nicole Raffel on 5 July 1950. They had four children: Olivier, Laurent, Thierry, and Marie-Hélène.

He died suddenly in his office at the Dassault Group headquarters in Paris on 28 May 2018, from heart failure at the age of 93.

See also
 List of French people by net worth
 The World's Billionaires

References

External links

Serge Dassault and family – Forbes profile

1925 births
2018 deaths
Politicians from Paris
Serge
French Roman Catholics
French people of Jewish descent
National Centre of Independents and Peasants politicians
Rally for the Republic politicians
Union for a Popular Movement politicians
Gaullism, a way forward for France
French Senators of the Fifth Republic
Mayors of places in Île-de-France
French chief executives
French aerospace engineers
Corps de l'armement
Businesspeople in aviation
Dassault Group
French billionaires
Converts to Roman Catholicism from Judaism
French magazine publishers (people)
French mass media owners
French male writers
20th-century French newspaper publishers (people)
21st-century French newspaper publishers (people)
Lycée Janson-de-Sailly alumni
Lycée Saint-Louis alumni
École Polytechnique alumni
Supaéro alumni
HEC Paris alumni
Grand Officiers of the Légion d'honneur
Recipients of the Aeronautical Medal
Senators of Essonne
French politicians convicted of corruption